David Malcolm Storey (13 July 1933 – 27 March 2017) was an English playwright, screenwriter, award-winning novelist and a professional rugby league player.  He won the Booker Prize in 1976 for his novel Saville.  He also won the MacMillan Fiction Award for This Sporting Life in 1960.

Early life and career
Storey was born on 13 July 1933 in Wakefield, West Riding of Yorkshire, the son of a coal miner, Frank Richmond Story, and Lily (née Cartwright) Story. He was educated at QEGS Wakefield.

His plays include The Restoration of Arnold Middleton, The Changing Room, Cromwell, Home, and Stages. His novels include Flight into Camden, which won the 1961 John Llewellyn Rhys Prize and the 1963 Somerset Maugham Award; and Saville, which won the 1976 Booker Prize.

He wrote the screenplay for This Sporting Life (1963), directed by Lindsay Anderson, adapted from his first novel of the same name, originally published in 1960, which won the 1960 Macmillan Fiction Award. The film was the beginning of a long professional association with Anderson, whose film version of Storey's play In Celebration was released as part of the American Film Theatre series in 1975. Home and Early Days (both starred Sir Ralph Richardson; Home also starred Sir John Gielgud) were made into television films.

Storey's novel Pasmore was shortlisted for the Booker Prize.

National Life Stories conducted an oral history interview (C464/67) with David Storey in 2008-2009 for its National Life Stories General collection held by the British Library.

Personal life and death

In 1956, Storey married Barbara Rudd Hamilton, with whom he had four children. Barbara Storey died in 2015.

Storey died on 27 March 2017 in London at the age of 83 and was buried on the eastern side of Highgate Cemetery. The cause was Parkinson's disease and dementia. Survivors include his two sons, Jake and Sean; two daughters, Helen and Kate; a brother, Anthony; and six grandchildren.

Works
This Sporting Life (1960) (made into the 1963 film This Sporting Life)
Flight into Camden (1961) - winner of the 1963 Somerset Maugham Award
Radcliffe (1963)
The Restoration of Arnold Middleton (1967)
In Celebration (1969)
The Contractor (1970)
Home (1970)
The Changing Room (1973)
Pasmore (1972) – winner of the 1973 Geoffrey Faber Memorial Prize
The Farm (1973)
Cromwell (1973)
A Temporary Life (1973)
Edward (1973)
Life Class (1974)
Saville (1976) – winner of the 1976 Booker Prize
Mother's Day (1977)
Early Days (1980)
Sisters (1980)
A Prodigal Child (1982)
Present Times (1984)
The March on Russia (1989)
Storey's Lives: 1951–1991 (1992)
A Serious Man (1998)
As It Happened (2002)
Thin-Ice Skater (2004)
A Stinging Delight (Autobiography) (Faber & Faber, 2021)

References

Sources
 Harrison, Juliet Francis Artistic Fictions:  The Representation of the Artist Figure in Works by David Storey, John Fowles and Tom Stoppard (Ph.D., Exeter).
Hutchings, William, ed. David Storey:  A Casebook.  NY:  Garland, 1992.
Hutchings, William.  The Plays of David Storey:  A Thematic Study.  Carbondale:  Southern Illinois UP, 1988.
Liebman, Herbert The Dramatic Art of David Storey:  The Journey of a Playwright,  Greenwood Press.
Schafer, Stephen C.  "An Overview of the Working Classes in British Feature Film from the 1960s to the 1980s: From Class Consciousness to Marginalization", International Labor and Working-Class History 59: 3–14.
Encyclopedia of British Film
Contemporary Authors

External links
Information on Storey's plays
Biography

1933 births
2017 deaths
Alumni of the Slade School of Fine Art
Burials at Highgate Cemetery
English male dramatists and playwrights
English male novelists
English screenwriters
English male screenwriters
People educated at Queen Elizabeth Grammar School, Wakefield
People from Wakefield
Booker Prize winners
John Llewellyn Rhys Prize winners
20th-century English novelists
20th-century English dramatists and playwrights
20th-century English male writers
English rugby league players